The Tegla Kar Dzong was a fort located on a cliff above the town of Burang (also called Taklakot) in Burang County, southwestern Tibet near the Nepalese border. It seems that the Tegla Kar was built during the Zhangzhung period which was conquered by the Tibetan King Songtsen Gampo in the beginning of 7th century. It became the main fort of the kingdom of Burang in the 10th century during the reign of King Kori. The kingdom disappeared during the 15th century. After the decline of the kingdom the Dzong was converted into a convent. Tegla Kar and the nearby Simbiling Monastery was completely destroyed by artillery in 1967 during the Chinese Cultural Revolution.

References

Forts in Tibet
Dzongs in Tibet
Tibetan Buddhist monasteries
Ngari Prefecture
1967 disestablishments